The International Convention on the Establishment of an International Fund for Compensation for Oil Pollution Damage, 1992, often referred to as FUND92 or FUND, is an international maritime treaty, administered by the International Maritime Organization. The original FUND convention in 1969 was drawn up as an enhancement to CLC meant on one hand to relieve shipowners from unfair liabilities due to unforeseeable circumstances and on the other hand remove liability caps that some member states thought were too low. The fund is obliged to pay victims of pollution when damages exceed the shipowner's liability, when there is no liable shipowner, or when the shipowner is unable to pay its liability. The fund is also required to "indemnify the shipowner or his insurer" in spills where a ship is in full compliance with international conventions, and no wilful misconduct caused the spill.

The 1992 convention came into force on 30 May 2006. As of November 2018, the convention had been ratified by 115 states representing 95 per cent of the gross tonnage of the world's merchant fleet. The Bolivian, North Korean, Honduran, Lebanese, and, Mongolian flags of convenience have not ratified the treaty.

References

Environmental treaties
Environmental impact of shipping
International Maritime Organization treaties
Law of the sea treaties
Oil spills
Treaties concluded in 1992
1992 in London
Treaties entered into force in 1996
1996 in the environment
Treaties of Albania
Treaties of Algeria
Treaties of Angola
Treaties of Antigua and Barbuda
Treaties of Argentina
Treaties of Australia
Treaties of the Bahamas
Treaties of Bahrain
Treaties of Barbados
Treaties of Belgium
Treaties of Belize
Treaties of the People's Republic of Benin
Treaties of Brunei
Treaties of Bulgaria
Treaties of Cambodia
Treaties of Cameroon
Treaties of Canada
Treaties of Cape Verde
Treaties extended to Hong Kong
Treaties of Colombia
Treaties of the Comoros
Treaties of the Republic of the Congo
Treaties of the Cook Islands
Treaties of Croatia
Treaties of Cyprus
Treaties of Denmark
Treaties of Djibouti
Treaties of Dominica
Treaties of the Dominican Republic
Treaties of Ecuador
Treaties of Estonia
Treaties of Fiji
Treaties of Finland
Treaties of France
Treaties of Gabon
Treaties of Georgia (country)
Treaties of Germany
Treaties of Ghana
Treaties of Greece
Treaties of Grenada
Treaties of Guinea
Treaties of Hungary
Treaties of Iceland
Treaties of India
Treaties of Iran
Treaties of Ireland
Treaties of Israel
Treaties of Italy
Treaties of Ivory Coast
Treaties of Jamaica
Treaties of Japan
Treaties of Kenya
Treaties of Kiribati
Treaties of Latvia
Treaties of Liberia
Treaties of Lithuania
Treaties of Luxembourg
Treaties of Madagascar
Treaties of Malaysia
Treaties of the Maldives
Treaties of Malta
Treaties of the Marshall Islands
Treaties of Mauritania
Treaties of Mauritius
Treaties of Mexico
Treaties of Monaco
Treaties of Montenegro
Treaties of Morocco
Treaties of Mozambique
Treaties of Namibia
Treaties of the Netherlands
Treaties of New Zealand
Treaties of Nicaragua
Treaties of Nigeria
Treaties of Niue
Treaties of Norway
Treaties of Oman
Treaties of Palau
Treaties of Panama
Treaties of Papua New Guinea
Treaties of the Philippines
Treaties of Poland
Treaties of Portugal
Treaties of Qatar
Treaties of South Korea
Treaties of Russia
Treaties of Saint Kitts and Nevis
Treaties of Saint Lucia
Treaties of Saint Vincent and the Grenadines
Treaties of Samoa
Treaties of Senegal
Treaties of Serbia
Treaties of Seychelles
Treaties of Sierra Leone
Treaties of Singapore
Treaties of Slovenia
Treaties of South Africa
Treaties of Spain
Treaties of Sri Lanka
Treaties of Sweden
Treaties of Syria
Treaties of Switzerland
Treaties of Thailand
Treaties of Tonga
Treaties of Trinidad and Tobago
Treaties of Tunisia
Treaties of Turkey
Treaties of Tuvalu
Treaties of the United Arab Emirates
Treaties of the United Kingdom
Treaties of Tanzania
Treaties of Uruguay
Treaties of Vanuatu
Treaties of Venezuela
Treaties extended to Jersey
Treaties extended to the Falkland Islands
Treaties extended to the Isle of Man
Treaties extended to Montserrat
Treaties extended to South Georgia and the South Sandwich Islands
Treaties extended to Anguilla
Treaties extended to Bermuda
Treaties extended to the British Antarctic Territory
Treaties extended to the British Indian Ocean Territory
Treaties extended to the British Virgin Islands
Treaties extended to the Pitcairn Islands
Treaties extended to Akrotiri and Dhekelia
Treaties extended to the Cayman Islands
Treaties extended to Gibraltar
Treaties extended to Saint Helena, Ascension and Tristan da Cunha
Treaties extended to Aruba
Treaties extended to the Netherlands Antilles